Raymond Lim Siang Keat (born 24 June 1959) is a former Singaporean politician. A member of the governing People's Action Party (PAP), Lim has been a Member of Parliament (MP) representing the East Coast Group Representation Constituency for Fengshan from 2001 to 2015. He served as the Minister for Transport from 2006 to 2011, and as a Minister in the Prime Minister's Office from 2005 to 2006. He retired from politics in 2015.

Education
Lim was a Rhodes Scholar and Colombo Plan scholar and holds degrees from the universities of Adelaide, Oxford and King's College, Cambridge (LLM, 1987). Prior to his university education, he was a student and athlete in Raffles Institution.

Personal life
Lim's brother, Benny Lim Siang Hoe, was with the Internal Security Department, and is also a former Permanent Secretary at the Ministry of National Development.

External links
Lim Siang Keat Raymond Lim Siang Keat at parliament.gov.sg

1959 births
Living people
University of Adelaide alumni
Alumni of Balliol College, Oxford
Alumni of King's College, Cambridge
Members of the Cabinet of Singapore
People's Action Party politicians
Members of the Parliament of Singapore
Singaporean people of Chinese descent
Singaporean Rhodes Scholars
Ministers for Transport of Singapore